Stouts Creek is a stream in Iron and Madison counties in the U.S. state of Missouri. The stream headwaters lie just northwest of Taum Sauk Mountain and it flows north then east to cross under Missouri Route 21 between Ironton and Arcadia. It continues east passing under Missouri Route 72 and past Lake Killarney. It flows into Madison County to its confluence with the St. Francis River east of Roselle.

Stouts Creek has the name of Ephraim Stout, a pioneer citizen.

See also
List of rivers of Missouri

References

Rivers of Iron County, Missouri
Rivers of Madison County, Missouri
Rivers of Missouri